Harpalus vernicosus is a species of ground beetle in the subfamily Harpalinae. It was described by Kataev & Liang in 2007.

References

vernicosus
Beetles described in 2007